This is a list of all of the official Valérian and Laureline books.  Each story was written by Pierre Christin, drawn by Jean-Claude Mézières and coloured by Evelyn Tran-Lé.



Albums
Every Valérian adventure from Bad Dreams to The Wrath of Hypsis was first serialised in the Franco-Belgian comics magazine Pilote. The first story to be collected in  comic album format was The City of Shifting Waters which was numbered "1" in the series. When Bad Dreams was eventually collected as an album, it was given the number "0" to reflect its position as the debut adventure in the series. The dates given in the following list are the year of first publication of each story in album format:

With Jean-Claude Mezieres and Pierre Christin having retired from writing further Valerian & Laureline adventures in 2010, other writers and illustrators were later commissioned to create new stories.

Short stories
Seven short stories were also published in the quarterly, digest-sized Super Pocket Pilote between 1969 and 1970 and later collected in Across the Pathways of Space (Par Les Chemins De l’Espace) (1997):

Hardcover collection

During 2017 and 2018 the British publisher Cinebook Limited published a hardcover collection of the series titled; Valerian: The Complete Collection, spread over seven volumes, with three to four stories in each book. These volumes are in full original color, printed on glossy paper and measure 220 mm × 290 mm.

Other publications
 Les Habitants du Ciel: Atlas Cosmique de Valérian et Laureline (literally "The Inhabitants of the Sky: The Cosmic Atlas of Valerian and Laureline") is an illustrated encyclopedia that gives further background detail to the many alien creatures Valérian and Laureline have encountered in their travels, first released in 1991 by parent publisher Dargaud. It has seen several translations into other languages as well, including a 2017 one in English by Titan Books as Valerian: The Illustrated Treasury, but adhering to the format set by Cinebook for its hardcover collection.
 Les Extras de Mézières ("Mézières' Extras") compiles various miscellaneous Valérian related works including stamps, murals, images from the pilot episode of the proposed animated series in 1991 and Laureline's Playboy spread as well as other non-Valérian related artwork.
 Les Extras de Mézières No.2 (Mon Cinquieme Element) ("Mézières' Extras No.2 (My Fifth Element)") primarily covers the work Mézières did on the 1997 Luc Besson film The Fifth Element but does also show where that film was influenced by the Valérian albums. Like the first outing, it is primarily an art book and neither has therefore seen any translated editions as of 2019.

References